Fernando Santamaría Prieto (born 12 December 1952) is a Mexican politician from the National Action Party. From 2009 to 2012 he served as Deputy of the LXI Legislature of the Mexican Congress representing Veracruz, and previously served in the Congress of Veracruz.

References

1952 births
Living people
Politicians from Veracruz
National Action Party (Mexico) politicians
20th-century Mexican politicians
21st-century Mexican politicians
Members of the Congress of Veracruz
Deputies of the LXI Legislature of Mexico
Members of the Chamber of Deputies (Mexico) for Veracruz